Milord (also m'lord, from my lord) is a manner of address to a nobleman, the masculine form of milady. (my lady, also m'lady)

Milord or M'Lord or My Lord or similar, may also refer to:

Music
 "Milord" (song), a 1958 song by Georges Moustaki and Marguerite Monnot and Ernst Bader, sung by Édith Piaf
 Milord (album), a 1960 album by Dalida, containing the eponymous 1958 song
 Les Milords, a 1960s band founded by Jean-Pierre Massiera
 M'Lords, a 1960s band which contained Peter Gabriel

Other uses
 Roland Milord, a silver medalist in wrestling at the 1950 British Empire Games
 Milord (vehicle), a type of vehicle, a variant of the convertible
 Mylord (coach), a type of horse drawn coach
 MILORD, a fictional WWII resistance organization from the Norwegian TV show Brødrene Dal

See also

 
 
 Milady (disambiguation)
 Lord (disambiguation)
 MY (disambiguation)
 mi (disambiguation)